Ernest Fraser "Ernie" Hills (3 March 1930 – 7 October 2020) was a rugby union, and latterly rugby league, player who represented Australia.

Career 
Hills, a wing, was born in Auckland, NZ and claimed a total of 2 international rugby caps for Australia in 1950.  He was a junior national sprint champion in New Zealand and represented Victoria at state level. He was considered a shock selection for the national team, with the team captain and coach Trevor Allan not knowing him before he was selected in the team.

In 1951 he returned to New Zealand and enlisted to serve in the Dominion Force in the Korean War.

Later in the 1950s he played rugby league in Australia for Western Suburbs.

References 

1930 births
2020 deaths
Australian rugby league players
Australian rugby union players
Australia international rugby union players
New Zealand military personnel of the Korean War
Rugby league players from Auckland
Rugby league wingers
Rugby union players from Auckland
Rugby union wings
Western Suburbs Magpies players